Old Hijazi, or Old Higazi, is a variety of Old Arabic attested in Hejaz (the western part of Saudi Arabia) from about the 1st century to the 7th century. It is the variety thought to underlie the Quranic Consonantal Text (QCT) and in its later iteration was the prestige spoken and written register of Arabic in the Umayyad Caliphate.

Classification 
Old Ḥijāzī is characterized by the innovative relative pronoun ʾallaḏī, ʾallatī, etc., which is attested once in the inscription JSLih 384 and is the common form in the QCT, as opposed to the form ḏ- which is otherwise common to Old Arabic.

The infinitive verbal complement is replaced with a subordinating clause ʾan yafʿala, attested in the QCT and a fragmentary Dadanitic inscription.

The QCT along with the papyri of the first century after the Islamic conquests attest a form with an l-element between the demonstrative base and the distal particle, producing from the original proximal set ḏālika and tilka.

The emphatic interdental and lateral were realized as voiced, in contrast to Northern Old Arabic, where they were voiceless.

Phonology

Consonants 

The sounds in the chart above are based on the constructed phonology of Proto-Semitic and the phonology of Modern Hejazi Arabic.

Notes:

 The glottal stop  was lost in Old Hejazi, except after word-final [aː]. It is still retained in Modern Hejazi in few positions.
(See Hejazi Arabic)

Vowels 

In contrast to Classical Arabic, Old Hejazi had the phonemes [] and [], which arose from the contraction of Old Arabic [aja] and [awa], respectively. It also may have had short [e] from the reduction of [] in closed syllables:

The QCT attests a phenomenon of pausal final long -ī dropping, which was virtually obligatory.

Example 
Here is an example of reconstructed Old Hejazi side-by-side with its classicized form, with remarks on phonology:

Notes:
 Basmala: final short vowels are lost in context, the /l/ is not assimilated in the definite article
 Line 2: the glottal stop is lost in /qurʾān/ (> /qurān), proto-Arabic */tišqaya/ collapses to /tašqē/
 Line 3: /taḏkirah/ < */taḏkirat/ < */taḏkirata/. The feminine ending was probably diptotic in Old Hejazi, and without nunation
 Line 4: /tanzīlā/ from loss of nunation and subsequent lengthening. Loss of glottal stop in /alarḍ/ has evidence in early scribal traditions and is supported by Warsh
 Line 5: Elision of the definite article's vowel in /lʿarš/ is supported by similar contextual elision in the Damascus psalm fragment. /astawē/ with fixed prothetic /a-/ is considered a hallmark of Old Hejazi, and numerous examples are found in the Damascus psalm fragment and support for it is found as well in Judeo-Christian Arabic texts. The word /ʿalay/ contains an uncollapsed final diphthong.
 Line 8: Old Hejazi may have had /huww/ < */huwwa/ < */hūwa/ < */hūʾa/ with an originally long vowel instead of /huwa/ < */huʾa/ as in Classical Arabic. This is supported by its spelling هو which indicates a consonantal /w/ rather than هوا had the word ended in a /ū/.
 Line 10: The orthography indicates /rāʾ/ , from */rāʾa/ < */rāya/ < */raʾaya/

Grammar

Proto-Arabic 

Proto-Arabic nouns could take one of the five above declensions in their basic, unbound form.

Notes 
The definite article spread areally among the Central Semitic languages and it would seem that Proto-Arabic lacked any overt marking of definiteness.

Old Hejazi (Quranic Consonantal Text) 

The Qur'anic Consonantal Text presents a slightly different paradigm to the Safaitic, in which there is no case distinction with determined triptotes, but the indefinite accusative is marked with a final /ʾ/.

Notes 
In JSLih 384, an early example of Old Hejazi, the Proto-Central Semitic /-t/ allomorph survives in bnt as opposed to /-ah/ < /-at/ in s1lmh.

Old Ḥejāzī is characterized by the innovative relative pronoun ʾallaḏī, ʾallatī, etc., which is attested once in JSLih 384 and is the common form in the QCT.

The infinitive verbal complement is replaced with a subordinating clause ʾan yafʿala, attested in the QCT and a fragmentary Dadanitic inscription.

The QCT along with the papyri of the first century after the Islamic conquests attest a form with an l-element between the demonstrative base and the distal particle, producing from the original proximal set ḏālika and tilka.

Writing systems

Dadanitic 
A single text, JSLih 384, composed in the Dadanitic script, from northwest Arabia, provides the only non-Nabataean example of Old Arabic from the Ḥijāz.

Transitional Nabataeo-Arabic 
A growing corpus of texts carved in a script in between Classical Nabataean Aramaic and what is now called the Arabic script from Northwest Arabia provides further lexical and some morphological material for the later stages of Old Arabic in this region. The texts provide important insights as to the development of the Arabic script from its Nabataean forebear and are an important glimpse of the Old Ḥejāzī dialects.

Arabic (Quranic Consonantal Text and 1st c. Papyri) 
The QCT represents an archaic form of Old Hejazi.

Greek (Damascus Psalm Fragment) 
The Damascus Psalm Fragment in Greek script represents a later form of prestige spoken dialect in the Umayyad Empire that may have roots in Old Hejazi. It shares features with the QCT such as the non-assimilating /ʾal-/ article and the pronominal form /ḏālika/. However, it shows a phonological merger between [] and [aː] and the development of a new front allophone of [a(ː)] in non-emphatic contexts, perhaps realized [e(ː)]. (citation?)

See also 
 Arabic language
 Varieties of Arabic
 Hejazi Arabic
 Semitic languages

References

External links 

Arabic languages
History of the Arabian Peninsula
Languages attested from the 1st century
Languages extinct in the 7th century